Gladiolus triphyllus, the three-leaved gladiolus, is an erect perennial herb, 15–30 cm high, glabrous, glaucous, with an ovoid corm. Leaves usually  3 or 4, alternate, simple, entire, linear, the two lower 10-30 x 0.3-0.5 cm, the upper much reduced. Flowers on a spike, zygomorphic, perianth of 6 petaloid parts, 2.5–3 cm long, pale or dark rose pink, smelling only in the afternoon, bracts 1.5–3 cm long. Flowers Mars-May. Fruit a capsule.

Habitat 
Openings of pine forests, maquis, garigue on limestone or igneous formations from 0 to 1200 m altitude.

Distribution 
Endemic to Cyprus, locally common especially in Akamas (Smyies, Fontana, Amoroza, Karavopetres, Erimites etc.), Tripylos, Dodheka Anemi (Paphos forest), Stavrovouni, Akrotiri, Pentadaktylos, Yialousa.

References

External links
http://www.pbase.com/image/89673977
http://davesgarden.com/guides/pf/showimage/234097/
http://www.ukwildflowers.com/Web_pages/gladiolus_triphyllus.htm
http://www.biolib.cz/en/image/id47431/
http://www.europeana.eu/portal/record/11605/_HERBAR_BGBM_GERMANY_B_10_0072745.html
http://www.ipernity.com/tag/anke/keyword/69011
http://naturewonders.piwigo.com/picture?/2482
http://www.theplantlist.org/tpl/record/kew-329549
http://media.eol.org/content/2012/01/23/15/30815_orig.jpg

triphyllus
Endemic flora of Cyprus